Swan Bay is a locality and small rural community in the local government area of Launceston, in the Launceston and surrounds region of Tasmania. The Tamar River forms the western and north-western boundaries, while Swan Bay Creek forms the northern. The 2016 census determined a population of 286 for the state suburb of Swan Bay.

Road infrastructure
The C739 route (Windermere Road) intersects with the East Tamar Highway in the north-east of the locality, passing through from north-east to south-west.

References

Suburbs of Launceston, Tasmania
Localities of City of Launceston
Towns in Tasmania